Shane Anthony Wiebe (born January 12, 1983) is a singer-songwriter who competed on the second season of Canadian Idol. He made it to the top five of the competition before being eliminated. Zack Werner said Shane could sing the phone book and it would still be great.  While he currently calls Stratford, Ontario, home, he was born in Calgary, Alberta, on January 12, 1983.  He is married to Angela (née) Bensler, who also performed on his debut album. Since Canadian Idol, he and his wife have formed the group The Wiebes, and have released their own debut album, Into Your Light, followed up by a Christmas album, released Christmas 2009.

Canadian Idol

Performances and results
Songs Shane performed on Canadian Idol included

First audition: You Raise Me Up (Josh Groban)

Toronto auditions: When a Man Loves a Woman (Percy Sledge) (solo)

Top 32: Forever Young (Bob Dylan)

Top 10: My Song (Glass Tiger)

Top 9: Something About the Way You Look Tonight (Elton John)

Top 8: I Believe in a Thing Called Love (The Darkness)

Top 7: Angel (Lionel Richie)

Top 6: The Way I Feel (Gordon Lightfoot)

Top 5: Can't Take My Eyes Off You (Frankie Valli)

Discography
Albums
Shane Wiebe (July 2005)
 Into Your Light (2009)
 Christmas With You (2009)
 Restore the Wonder (2010)

Singles
 "When I am With You" (2005)
 "What Child Is This?" (2005)
 "Christmas With You" (2009)

Debut album: Shane Wiebe (2005)
Shane's debut album was simply titled Shane Wiebe and has gotten many positive reviews by both music critics and many fans alike.  Nine of the eleven songs on the album were written or cowritten by Shane.  The other two songs are covers of numbers he performed on his Canadian Idol stint (The Way I Feel and Forever Young). First single When I am With You has begun to pick up radio airplay across Canada.  His wife, Angela, plays violin and does background vocals on the album, as well as sings lead on a song that they co-wrote called "Trace You".

Track listing
 "When I Am With You"
 "The Way I Feel"
 "Came Out Wrong"
 "Just Wait"
 "Love Is"
 "Forever Young"
 "I'm Not Alone"
 "Another Day"
 "Never Lived At All"
 "Riches"
 "Trace You (Lost In Your Love)"

Reception
The album has sold 10,000 copies. It has also peaked at #71 on the Canadian Albums Chart.

Personal life
Shane won the Bootlegger contest, in 2006, finishing first in a pool of young Canadians each with their big dreams to realize. He also lived in Chilliwack, BC with his family.

Awards and nominations

References

External links
 Shane Wiebe official site
 The Wiebes official site

1983 births
Canadian Idol participants
Canadian performers of Christian music
Living people
Musicians from Calgary
Canadian Mennonites
Mennonite musicians